Sir John Antony Hood  (born 2 January 1952) is a New Zealand businessman and administrator. He was Vice-Chancellor of the University of Oxford from 5 October 2004 until 30 September 2009. He was the first Vice-Chancellor to be elected from outside Oxford's academic body in 900 years, and the first to have addressed the scholars' congregation via a webcast. In March 2007 New Zealand Prime Minister Helen Clark awarded him the World Class New Zealand supreme award to honour his contribution to profiling New Zealand and New Zealanders internationally. On 15 November 2007 he announced that he would not seek an extension to his five-year term as Vice Chancellor, and that he would leave Oxford in September 2009.

Early life and education
Born on 2 January 1952 in Napier, New Zealand, Hood attended Westlake Boys High School in Auckland, where a house has been named after him (Hood House).

From 1970 to 1976, Hood attended the University of Auckland, where he graduated with a B.E. in 1972 and a PhD in Civil Engineering in 1976. His doctoral thesis was entitled A theoretical and experimental investigation of a curved, single cell box-girder bridge. He was then awarded a Rhodes Scholarship to Oxford, where he resided in Worcester College and studied for an M.Phil. in Management. He won a Blue playing squash for Oxford University and also played first-class cricket for Oxford University in 1977.

Career

Career in New Zealand
He has held a number of directorships in prominent New Zealand companies and bodies, including Fonterra, Fletcher Challenge and the New Zealand Cricket review of 1995. His career at Fletcher Challenge is described in the book Battle of the Titans by Bruce Wallace. From 1999 to 2004, he was Vice-Chancellor of the University of Auckland.

Vice-chancellor of the University of Oxford
Hood's term as vice-chancellor of Oxford has been the subject of controversy. Hood had proposed to reform the 900-year-old tradition of complete self-governance by introducing a number of external members to council, and by separating academic and financial boards. The initial proposal called for a majority of external members of council, bringing Oxford into line with all other UK universities except the University of Cambridge. Following a two-hour debate, the proposal was amended by Congregation to allow the election of a college fellow, a further insider, to the council within five years, resulting in a majority of eight insiders (including the vice-chancellor) on the 15-member council. The amendment was supported by a majority of votes (657 to 502), with both supporters and opponents of the reforms claiming victory. 

The amended proposal was brought to vote by Congregation on 28 November 2006, and was defeated by 730 to 456 votes. A postal vote was called on 5 December, with ballots being sent to all 3000 members of Congregation and votes being accepted until 18 December. On 19 December it was announced that the proposal had once again been defeated, this time by 1540 to 997 votes. Hood stated that he would not treat the defeat as a vote of no confidence, citing a need to "put aside division, continue dialogue with all shades of opinion and, in an atmosphere of trust, tolerance and goodwill, promote the academic aims and ideals of Oxford".

The proposed reform met with opposition not because it would invite outside opinion on the university's financial and academic decisions, but because of the impression that control would be wrested from Congregation, thus threatening the university's academic reputation. Furthermore, some opponents claimed that the reform would place too much power in the hands of the vice-chancellor. Other critics questioned the applicability of corporate models of governance in educational institutions. Lord Patten of Barnes stated in December 2006 that without reforms to Oxford's governance it would be more difficult to raise money he said was needed by the university, particularly with respect to needs-based funding to support students from poorer backgrounds. Similarly, Hood stated at the same time that the issue was not "whether there has to be change, but what kind of change."

Others criticised the appointment of the Registrar, Julie Maxton, who was noted to be a former colleague of Hood. Maxton was chosen for the position of Registrar by way of a selection committee including consultants, external members of council, and the vice-chancellor of Cambridge.

Comparisons were drawn with Lawrence Summers, the 27th President of Harvard University, who announced his resignation on 21 February 2006 following two motions of censure. Although individual academic staff were critical of Hood, no formal motions were brought forward calling for his resignation. However, an informal letter of confidence organised by his supporters in February 2006 attracted only about fifty signatories from Members of Congregation. Contested  elections to the Council of the University by Congregation resulted in the election of three leading critics of Hood's proposals, namely Susan Cooper in 2005, Nicholas Bamforth in 2006, and Donald Fraser, who was elected unopposed, also in 2006.

In June 2007 it was revealed that the University press office had been monitoring and editing comments in Hood's Wikipedia article in an attempt to protect his reputation. In the same month, two further critics of Hood, Colin Thompson and Peter Robbins, were elected to the council.

Andrew Hamilton, who had previously served as the Provost of Yale University, was nominated on 3 June 2008 to succeed John Hood as Vice-Chancellor of Oxford University from 1 October 2009.
 His appointment was confirmed on 16 June 2008.

Later career
He is a non-executive director of BG Group Plc, and will be President and Chief Executive Officer of the Robertson Foundation from 2010.

In December 2011, John Hood became Chair of Rhodes Trustees.

In January 2012, the board of global private education provider Study Group appointed John Hood as chairman.

In the 2014 Queen's Birthday Honours, Hood was appointed a Knight Companion of the New Zealand Order of Merit (KNZM) for services to tertiary education.

Personal life
Hood has three children.

See also
 List of Vice-Chancellors of the University of Oxford
 Lord Patten of Barnes, Chancellor of Oxford University

References

Bibliography

External links
 Oxford University Vice-Chancellor information
 Q and A to congregation

University of Auckland alumni
New Zealand Rhodes Scholars
Vice-Chancellors of the University of Oxford
Alumni of Worcester College, Oxford
Fellows of All Souls College, Oxford
Oxford University cricketers
1952 births
Living people
People from Napier, New Zealand
People educated at Westlake Boys High School
New Zealand businesspeople
Knights Companion of the New Zealand Order of Merit
Fonterra people
Vice-Chancellors of the University of Auckland
Rhodes Trustees
New Zealand cricketers